Ogcocephalus pumilus, the dwarf batfish, is a species of fish in the anglerfish genus in the batfish family Ogcocephalidae.

The fish is found in the Western Central Atlantic Ocean in the Caribbean Sea and off Suriname.

References

Ogcocephalidae
Taxa named by Margaret G. Bradbury
Fish described in 1980